Turridrupa jubata, common name the crested pleurotoma, is a species of sea snail, a marine gastropod mollusk in the family Turridae, the turrids.

Description
The length of the shell attains 33.7 mm.

The smooth shell is acuminately fusiform. It is yellowish brown, the anterior end is white. The whorls are many-keeled. The middle keel is the largest, with a beaded row of granules immediately over it (about 25 per whorl). The siphonal canal is rather short. 

The sinus apex is situated at the end of the mid-shoulder cord. The sinus cord is finely gemmate.

The whorls are covered with several keels, of which the middle one is the largest. They contain a beaded row of granules immediately over it. The shell is yellowish brown.

Distribution
This marine species occurs off the Philippines, Indonesia, Japan, New Caledonia and Papua New Guinea

References

 Liu, J.Y. [Ruiyu] (ed.). (2008). Checklist of marine biota of China seas. China Science Press. 1267 pp.

External links
Yuri I. Kantor, On the morphology and homology of the “central tooth” in the radulae of Turrinae (Conoidea: Turridae) ; Ruthenica, 2006, 16(1-2): 47-52.

jubata
Gastropods described in 1843